Encore (2002) is an album by English soprano Sarah Brightman. It includes tracks from two previous Sarah Brigtman/Andrew Lloyd Webber albums (The Songs That Got Away and Surrender), and four previously unreleased tracks. This is similar to Classics which only featured four new songs.

Track listing

Charts

References

2002 albums
Sarah Brightman albums
Albums produced by Andrew Lloyd Webber
Albums produced by Nigel Wright